The Roe Award is an annual award given by the State Policy Network that "pays tribute to those in the state public policy movement whose achievements have greatly advanced the free market philosophy" and "recognizes leadership, innovation and accomplishment in public policy." Established in 1992, it is named after the late founder of the State Policy Network, Thomas A. Roe.

During the first decade of the award, there were multiple winners. Beginning in 2003, the prize was limited to one winner per year. The ceremony in 2013 marked the first time three individuals from one organization had received the Roe Award.  The Mackinac Center was also honored for their 25-year effort to pass right to work law in Michigan. Five other state-based think tanks have two individuals with the award.

Award recipients

References

External links 
 State Policy Network Roe Award

American awards